Watson is an unincorporated community in Burnet County, Texas, United States. According to the Handbook of Texas, the community had an estimated population of 98 in 2000.

History
The area in what is known as Watson today was named for local storeowner Ed Watson. A church, a cemetery, and several scattered homes were seen on county maps in the 1940s and 1980s. Its population was 98 in 2000.

Geography

Climate
The climate in this area is characterized by hot, humid summers and generally mild to cool winters. According to the Köppen Climate Classification system, Watson has a humid subtropical climate, abbreviated "Cfa" on climate maps.

Education
The first school in Watson was established in 1879. Another school, called Pleasant Hill or Red Bud School, was built in 1908. They joined the school district in Briggs in the 1930s. Today, Watson is served by the Burnet Consolidated Independent School District.

References

Unincorporated communities in Burnet County, Texas
Unincorporated communities in Texas